Andrei Vladimirovich Tarasenko (born 11 September 1968) is a retired Russian ice hockey player. He competed at the 1994 Winter Olympics, where his team finished in fourth place. He played eight games and scored two goals. After retiring he worked as the head coach and then senior coach with HC Sibir Novosibirsk, the club he played for in 1984–1986 and 2001–2003.

His son Vladimir is also an ice hockey player.

Career statistics

Regular season and playoffs

International

References

1968 births
Living people
HC Lada Togliatti players
HC Sibir Novosibirsk players
Ice hockey players at the 1994 Winter Olympics
Kazakhmys Satpaev players
Lokomotiv Yaroslavl players
Olympic ice hockey players of Russia
Torpedo Nizhny Novgorod players
Soviet ice hockey right wingers
Russian ice hockey right wingers
Sportspeople from Novosibirsk